José Luis Verduzco Preciado (born 17 January 1990) is a Mexican former footballer who last played for Loros de la Universidad de Colima.

Club career

Guadalajara
Verduzco was formed in C.D. Guadalajara's youth system. He made his professional debut on 2 September 2011 in a match against Club Tijuana. He is known for scoring the fourth goal in a friendly match against FC Barcelona during the 2011 World Football Challenge in which Guadalajara won by a score of 4–1.

Loros
After falling out of favor with Guadalajara, he was released from his contract. He joined Club Loros de la Universidad de Colima in 2013.

References

External links
 

C.D. Guadalajara footballers
Footballers from Colima
People from Colima City
1990 births
Living people
Association football midfielders
Association football defenders
Loros UdeC footballers
Liga MX players
Ascenso MX players
Mexican footballers